John William Gilbert, Baron Gilbert,  (5 April 1927 – 2 June 2013) was a British Labour Party politician.

Early life
Gilbert's father was a civil servant. Baron Gilbert was educated at Merchant Taylors' School, Northwood, St John's College, Oxford, where he studied philosophy, politics and economics, and New York University, where he gained a PhD in international economics. He then worked as a chartered accountant in Canada.

Parliamentary career
He contested the Parliamentary seat of Ludlow in 1966 and a by-election in Dudley in 1968 before being elected for Dudley in 1970 and (after boundary changes) Dudley East in 1974, which he represented until 1997, when it became part of the new Dudley North constituency (which was held by a new Labour MP) and Gilbert retired from the House of Commons.

In the Labour governments of Harold Wilson and James Callaghan he was Financial Secretary to the Treasury (1974–1975), Minister for Transport (1975–1976), and Minister of State for Defence (1976–1979). As Minister for Transport he approved the London M25 orbital motorway project and introduced the Bill to make the wearing of seat belts compulsory. He also served on the House of Commons Defence Committee (1979–1987) and the Trade and Industry Committee (1987–1992).

House of Lords
After his retirement from the House of Commons, he was created a Life Peer as Baron Gilbert, of Dudley in the County of West Midlands on 16 May 1997 and from 1997–1999 he was the Minister of State for Defence Procurement in Tony Blair's first government.
Always a staunch proponent of Britain's independent nuclear deterrent, he caused controversy when he proposed neutron bombing the Afghanistan-Pakistan border to "prevent people from infiltrating from one side to the other." In October 2012 he said in the House of Lords "The A400M [the RAF's new transport aircraft] is a complete, absolute wanking disaster, and we should be ashamed of ourselves. I have never seen such a waste of public funds in the defence field since I have been involved in it these past 40 years."

Personal life
Gilbert was married twice, firstly in 1950, to Hillary, daughter of Lord Strabolgi. They had two daughters, before divorcing in 1954.

Gilbert later married Jean Ross-Skinner in 1963.

He died in 2013 at the age of 86.

References

External links 
 
 Debrett's People of Today

|-

|-

|-

1927 births
2013 deaths
Alumni of St John's College, Oxford
Labour Party (UK) life peers
Labour Party (UK) MPs for English constituencies
Members of the Privy Council of the United Kingdom
New York University alumni
People educated at Merchant Taylors' School, Northwood
UK MPs 1970–1974
UK MPs 1974
UK MPs 1974–1979
UK MPs 1979–1983
UK MPs 1983–1987
UK MPs 1987–1992
UK MPs 1992–1997
Canadian accountants
British accountants
Secretaries of State for Transport (UK)
Life peers created by Elizabeth II